The 1963 Isle of Man TT motorcycle races were contested in six categories over the Snaefell Mountain Course. The Senior TT was won by Mike Hailwood on an MV Agusta.

1963 Isle of Man Lightweight TT 125cc final standings
3 Laps (113.00 Miles) Mountain Course.

1963 Sidecar TT final standings
3 Laps (113.00 Miles) Mountain Course.

1963 Isle of Man Lightweight TT 250cc final standings
6 Laps (226.38 Miles) Mountain Course.

1963 Isle of Man Junior TT 350cc final standings
6 Laps (236.38 Miles) Mountain Course.

1963 50cc Ultra-Lightweight TT final standings
3 Laps (113.00 Miles) Mountain Course.

 Fastest Lap; Ernst Degner 28 minutes 37.2 seconds, 79.10 mph.

1963 Isle of Man Senior TT 500cc final standings
6 Laps (236.38 Miles) Mountain Course.

Sources

External links
 Detailed race results
 Mountain Course map

Isle of Man Tt
Tourist Trophy
Isle of Man TT
Isle of Man TT